This article gives the discography for the English rock band The Zutons. Between their formation in 2001 and 2008 they released three studio albums and 14 singles, nine of which entered the top 40 UK singles chart.

The band released their debut album, entitled "Who Killed...... The Zutons?", in April 2004 to critical acclaim and it sold quite well, reaching number 6 in the UK album chart with Platinum status. Five singles were released from the album: "Pressure Point", "You Will You Won't", "Remember Me", "Don't Ever Think (Too Much)" and "Confusion" all released in 2004 and achieving number 19, number 22, number 39, number 15 and number 37 in the UK singles chart respectively.

In 2006 The Zutons released their second album, Tired of Hanging Around. It sold very well and reached number 2 in the UK album chart going Platinum. From this album, they released four singles: "Why Won't You Give Me Your Love?", "Valerie", "Oh Stacey (Look What You've Done!)" and "It's the Little Things We Do" all in 2006 achieving number 9, number 9, number 24 and number 47, in the UK singles chart respectively.

In June 2008, the band released their third studio album, "You Can Do Anything" which peaked at number 6 in the UK album chart. They released two singles from the album: "Always Right Behind You", which reached number 26 in the UK singles chart, and "What's Your Problem", which did not chart.

Albums

Studio albums

Live albums

Singles

Notes

Album appearances

References

 
Discographies of British artists
Rock music group discographies